Kraussia rugulosa is a species of crab in the family Xanthidae, the only species in the genus Kraussia.

References

Xanthoidea
Crustaceans described in 1843